Stainton is a hamlet and civil parish in Swaledale in the Richmondshire district of  North Yorkshire, England. It is located just outside the Yorkshire Dales National Park. The population of the parish was estimated at 10 in 2016.

It lies close to the army training camp of Wathgill in the adjoining civil parish of Walburn.  A large part of the parish consists of Ministry of Defence ranges and training areas.

Stainton was historically a township in the parish of Downholme in the wapentake of Hang West in the North Riding of Yorkshire.

Walburn became a separate civil parish in 1866.  In 1974 it was transferred to the new county of North Yorkshire.

References

External links

Villages in North Yorkshire
Civil parishes in North Yorkshire